Glycosylation-dependent cell adhesion molecule-1 (GLYCAM1) is a proteoglycan ligand expressed on cells of the high endothelial venules in lymphoid tissues. It is the ligand for the receptor L-selectin allowing for naive lymphocytes to exit the bloodstream into lymphoid tissues.
GLYCAM1 binds to L-selectin by presenting one or more O-linked carbohydrates to the lectin domain of the leukocyte cell surface selectin.
Data suggests that GLYCAM1 is a hormone-regulated milk protein that is part of the milk mucin complex.

GlyCAM-1 is expressed exclusively on high endothelial venules. It is unclear how GlyCAM-1 is attached to the membrane as it lacks a transmembrane region.

External links

References